The Walindi fairy-wrasse, Cirrhilabrus walindi, is a species of wrasse native to the coral reefs of the Pacific Ocean.

Named for Walindi Plantation Resort, located on the edge of Kimbe Bay, New Britain, Papua New Guinea, the type locality.

References

Walindi fairy-wrasse
Taxa named by Gerald R. Allen
Taxa named by John Ernest Randall
Fish described in 1996